Feel is a Polish band which was formed in Katowice (Upper Silesia) in 2005.
Originally called 'Q2', the band later adopted 'Kupicha Band' as its name and then finally 'Feel'.

The group released its debut album 'Feel' on November 26, 2007. Up to now their biggest success is winning the Bursztynowy Słowik (main award) as well as the People's Choice award at the 2007 Sopot International Song Festival with pop stars like Emmanuel Moire, Sophie Ellis-Bextor, Monrose, The Cloud Room, Thierry Amiel and September also in contention. The group enjoys great popularity in Poland, with both singles released so far achieving tremendous success, to the bewilderment of many independent music critics.

Their biggest hit, well known throughout the country, is called A gdy jest już ciemno "And When the Dusk Comes". Other popular songs include No Pokaż Na Co Cię Stać ("Show Me What You Can Do"), Jak Anioła Głos ("Like an Angel's Voice"), Pokonaj Siebie ("Defeat Yourself"), W Odpowiedzi na Twój List ("In Reply To Your Letter") and Pokaż Mi Niebo ("Show Me The Sky")

The band covered the 1993 song "Sweet Harmony" by the Beloved.

Discography

References

External links

Official website 

Sopot International Song Festival winners
Polish pop music groups
MTV Europe Music Award winners